Sir Quentin Saxby Blake,  (born 16 December 1932) is an English cartoonist, caricaturist, illustrator and children's writer. He has illustrated over 300 books, including 18 written by Roald Dahl, which are among his most popular works. For his lasting contribution as a children's illustrator he won the biennial international Hans Christian Andersen Award in 2002, the highest recognition available to creators of children's books. From 1999 to 2001, he was the inaugural British Children's Laureate. He is a patron of the Association of Illustrators.

Early life
Blake was born in 1932 in Sidcup, Kent, son of William and Evelyn Blake. His father was a civil servant, and his mother a housewife. Blake was evacuated to the West Country during the Second World War. He attended Holy Trinity Lamorbey Church of England Primary School and Chislehurst and Sidcup Grammar School, where his English teacher, J. H. Walsh, influenced his life's work. His artistic development during his school years was helped by contact with the painter and cartoonist Alfred Jackson, the husband of Blake's Latin teacher, who encouraged his first submissions to Punch, resulting in his first publication at the age of 16. In the sixth form, the school's art teacher, the painter Stanley Simmonds recognized Blake's talents and provided support and exposure to the work of other artists. He read English Literature at Downing College, Cambridge, under F. R. Leavis, from 1953 to 1956, received his postgraduate teaching diploma from the University of London Institute of Education, and later studied part-time at the Chelsea School of Art and later Camberwell College of Art. He has since denied that studying at the University of Cambridge contributed to his artistic or creative talent.

Career

During the 1960s, Blake taught English at the Lycée Français de Londres which cemented his long association with France and culminated in the award of the Legion of Honour. He taught at the Royal College of Art for over twenty years, where he was head of the Illustration department from 1978 to 1986.

The first book that Blake illustrated was The Wonderful Button by Evan Hunter, published by Abelard-Schuman in 1961. In his subsequent career, he gained a reputation as a loyal, reliable and humorous illustrator of more than 300 children's books, including some written by Joan Aiken, Elizabeth Bowen, Sylvia Plath, Roald Dahl, Nils-Olof Franzén, William Steig, and Dr. Seuss. He illustrated the first Seuss book that Seuss did not illustrate himself, Great Day for Up! (1974). 

By 2006, Blake had illustrated 323 books, of which he had written 35 and Dahl had written 18. To date, Blake has illustrated two of David Walliams' books and has illustrated Folio Society Limited Editions such as Don Quixote, Candide and 50 Fables of La Fontaine.

In the 1970s, Blake was an occasional presenter of the BBC children's storytelling programme Jackanory, when he would illustrate the stories on a canvas as he was telling them. In 1993, he designed the five British Christmas issue postage stamps featuring episodes from A Christmas Carol by Charles Dickens.

Blake is a member of the Chelsea Arts Club. He is patron of the Blake Society, Downing College's arts and humanities society. He is also a patron of "The Big Draw" which aims to get people drawing throughout the United Kingdom, and of The Nightingale Project, a charity that provides art to hospitals. Since 2006 he has produced work for several hospitals and mental health centres in the London area, a children's hospital (hopital Armand Trousseau) in Paris, and a maternity hospital in Angers, France. These projects are detailed in Blake's 2012 book Quentin Blake: Beyond the Page, which describes how, in his seventies, his work has increasingly appeared outside the pages of books, in public places such as hospitals, theatre foyers, galleries and museums. In 2007, he designed a huge mural on fabric, suspended over and thus disguising a ramshackle building immediately opposite an entrance to St Pancras railway station. The rendering of an "imaginary welcoming committee" greets passengers arriving on the Eurostar high-speed railway.

Blake is a supporter of and ambassador for the indigenous rights NGO Survival International. In 2009, he said, "For me, Survival is important for two reasons; one is that I think  right that we should give help and support to people who are threatened by the rapacious industrial society we have created; and the other that, more generally, it gives an important signal about how we all ought to be looking after the world. Its message is the most fundamental of any charity I'm connected with."

Blake is the Founding Trustee of House of Illustration, a centre in London for exhibitions, educational events and activities related to the art of illustration. He was also the subject of the first exhibition at this venue, entitled Inside Stories", which opened in July 2014. In August 2020, it was announced that the centre will be relocating to the 18th century Engine House at New River Head in the Clerkenwell area of London, and will be renamed the Quentin Blake Centre for Illustration.

Besides children's books, Blake is also the designer of Ben, the logo of the shop chain Ben's Cookies.  He designed several illustrations for the story time segments for the Scottish TV series Squeak!.

Comics
Blake was additionally the artist behind the comic strip Waldo and Wanda, written by John Yeoman.

Selected works 
The following books were both written and illustrated by Blake:
 Patrick (Jonathan Cape, 1968)

Jack and Nancy (Cape, 1969)
 Angelo (Cape, 1970)
 Snuff (Cape, 1973)
 Lester at the Seaside (William Collins, Sons, 1975)
 Lester and the Unusual Pet (Collins, 1975)
 The Adventures of Lester (BBC, 1977)
 Mister Magnolia (Cape, 1980) —winner of the Kate Greenaway Medal
 Quentin Blake's Nursery Rhyme Book (Cape, 1983)
 The Story of the Dancing Frog (Cape, 1984)
 Mrs Armitage On Wheels (Cape, 1987)
 Quentin Blake's ABC (Cape, 1989)
 All Join In (Cape, 1990) —winner of the Kurt Maschler Award for integrated text and illustration
 Cockatoos (Cape, 1992)
 Simpkin (Cape, 1993)
 The Quentin Blake Book of Nonsense Verse (Viking Press, 1994)
 Clown (Cape, 1995) —commended runner-up for the Greenaway Medal
 La Vie de la Page (Gallimard, 1995)
 Mrs Armitage and the Big Wave (Cape, 1997)
 Dix Grenouilles (Ten Frogs) (Gallimard, 1997)
 The Green Ship (Cape, 1998)
 Zagazoo (Cape, 1998)
 Zap! The Quentin Blake Guide to Electrical Safety (Eastern Electricity, 1998)
 Fantastic Daisy Artichoke (Cape, 1999)
 The Twelve Days of Christmas (Correspondence) (Atlantic Books, 1999)
 The Laureate's Party (Random House, 2000)
 Un Bateau Dans le Ciel (Rue du Monde, 2000)
 Words and Pictures (Cape, 2000)
 Tell Me a Picture (National Gallery, 2001)
 Loveykins (Cape, 2002)
 Laureate's Progress (Cape, 2002)
 Mrs Armitage, Queen of the Road (Cape, 2003)
 A Sailing Boat In The Sky (Random House: Red Fox, 2003)
 Angel Pavement (Cape, 2004)
 You're Only Young Twice (Andersen Press, 2008)
 Daddy Lost his Head (Andre Bouchard, 2009)
 Quentin Blake: Beyond the Page (Tate Publishing Ltd, 2012)
 "The Box of Delights; or, When the Wolves Were Running" John Masefield, Illustrated by Quentin Blake (Farshore, 2014)

Blake has illustrated a score of books by Roald Dahl.

He also illustrated the British edition of Agaton Sax, a Swedish-language series of comedy detective novels by Nils-Olof Franzén (originally illustrated by Åke Lewerth, 1955 to 1978).
 Agaton Sax and the Diamond Thieves, 1965
 Agaton Sax and the Scotland Yard Mystery, 1969
 Agaton Sax and the Max Brothers (a.k.a. Bank Robbers), 1970
 Agaton Sax and the Criminal Doubles, 1971
 Agaton Sax and the Colossus of Rhodes, 1972
 Agaton Sax and the London Computer Plot, 1973
 Agaton Sax and the League of Silent Exploders, 1974
 Agaton Sax and the Haunted House, 1975
 Agaton Sax and the Big Rig (extended), 1976
 Agaton Sax and Lispington's Grandfather Clock, 1978
Other
 The Learning Journey —National Curriculum, key stages 1 and 2, illustrated editions for parents
 Three Little Monkeys 2016, illustrated by Emma Chichester Clark
 Three Little Monkeys Ride Again 2019, illustrated by Emma Chichester Clark
 Three Little Monkeys at Christmas 2021, illustrated by Emma Chichester Clark

Honours and awards
Blake was the inaugural British Children's Laureate (1999–2001) and was elected as an Honorary Fellow of the Royal Academy of Arts in 2001, he received the biennial Hans Christian Andersen Award from the International Board on Books for Young People for his career contribution to children's literature in 2002. He was appointed Commander of the Order of the British Empire (CBE) in the 2005 New Year Honours for his services to children's literature. In France he was made a Knight of the Ordre des Arts et des Lettres in 2002 and elevated to Officer in 2007.

For Mister Magnolia, which he also wrote, Blake won the 1980 Kate Greenaway Medal from the Library Association, recognising the year's best children's book illustration by a British subject. For the 50th anniversary of the Medal (1955–2005), a panel of experts named it one of the top ten winning works, which composed the ballot for a public election of the nation's favourite. He was also a highly commended Greenaway runner-up for The Wild Washerwomen: A new folk tale, by John Yeoman (1979), and a commended runner-up for Clown (1995), which he wrote himself. He made the Greenaway shortlist for Zagazoo (1998), which he wrote, and for Sad Book (2004) by Michael Rosen.

Blake won the Kurt Maschler Award, or the Emil, for All Join In (Jonathan Cape, 1990), which he wrote and illustrated. The award from Maschler Publications and Booktrust annually recognised one British "work of imagination for children, in which text and illustration are integrated so that each enhances and balances the other." 

Blake was awarded the Prince Philip Designers Prize in 2011, and received the Eleanor Farjeon Award in November 2012. This annual award administered by Children's Book Circle recognises outstanding commitment and contribution to the world of British children's books. Blake was knighted in the 2013 New Year Honours for his services to illustration. 

In March 2014, he was awarded the insignia of a Chevalier de la Légion d'honneur at a ceremony at the Institut Français in London. He is also a Companion of the Guild of St George.

Blake was appointed Member of the Order of the Companions of Honour (CH) in the 2022 Birthday Honours for services to illustration.

See also

Notes

References

 D. Martin, "Quentin Blake", in Douglas Martin, The Telling Line: Essays On Fifteen Contemporary Book Illustrators (Julia MacRae Books, 1989), pp. 243–263
 Quentin Blake, "Research from an illustrator's point of view", in Research in Illustration: Conference Proceedings Part II (Brighton Polytechnic) (1981), pp. 25–61

External links

  (current); 
 
 
 Lambiek Comiclopedia article.

1932 births
20th-century English writers
20th-century English male writers
21st-century English writers
Living people
English cartoonists
English caricaturists
English children's book illustrators
English children's writers
English illustrators
English comics artists
Fellows of the Royal Society of Literature
Hans Christian Andersen Award for Illustration winners
Kate Greenaway Medal winners
Punch (magazine) cartoonists
Writers who illustrated their own writing
Academics of the Royal College of Art
Alumni of Downing College, Cambridge
Alumni of Chelsea College of Arts
Alumni of the Royal College of Art
Alumni of the University of the Arts London
Fellows of Chartered Society of Designers
Chevaliers of the Ordre des Arts et des Lettres
Commanders of the Order of the British Empire
Knights Bachelor
British stamp designers
People from Sidcup
People educated at Chislehurst and Sidcup Grammar School
British Children's Laureate
Royal Designers for Industry
Guild of St George
Members of the Order of the Companions of Honour